Picture Page is a British television non-fiction programme, broadcast by the BBC Television Service (now known as BBC One) from 1936 to 1939, and again after the service's hiatus during the Second World War from 1946 until 1952. It was the first British television series to become a long-term and regular popular success.

Format

The programme had a magazine format with two hour-long editions broadcast each week including a range of interviews with well-known personalities, features about a range of topics and coverage of public events. The main presenter during the pre-war era was Canadian actress Joan Miller who played the role of a "switchboard operator" similar to that of a telephone exchange, "connecting" the viewers to the particular guests and items being featured that week. Miller was nicknamed "The Switchboard Girl" in the popular press and became one of the first television celebrities. She would be assisted by Leslie Mitchell and Jasmine Bligh, two of the BBC's three continuity announcers (the other being Elizabeth Cowell). After the reinstatement of the programme during 1946, Joan Gilbert assumed presenting duties until 1952. Mary Malcolm presented some shows in 1949 and 1950.*Vahimagi, Tise (1994).

Preservation

Picture Page was produced live by the BBC from their Alexandra Palace television studio for the entirety of its run. The first episode was actually broadcast on 8 October 1936, some three and a half weeks before the official opening of the service on 2 November, as part of the ongoing test transmissions during the prelude to the initiation date. Until 1949 the series was not recorded and thus none of the pre-1949 programmes exist anymore. Four shows from 1951 have survived in the form of telerecordings.

Theme tune
The theme tune was composed by Philip Green.

References

External links
 

1936 in British television
1936 British television series debuts
1952 British television series endings
1930s British television series
1940s British television series
1950s British television series
BBC Television shows
Lost BBC episodes
1936 establishments in the United Kingdom
British non-fiction television series